Quilliam is a surname of Manx origin, meaning "William's son", and may refer to:

John Quilliam (1771–1829), a British Royal Navy officer and the First Lieutenant on HMS Victory at the Battle of Trafalgar
Peter Quilliam (1920–2004), a New Zealand lawyer
Peter Quilliam (pharmacologist) (1915–2003), a British pharmacologist
Susan Quilliam (born 1950), an agony aunt and author noted for bringing systemic psychology to a mass audience
Wayne Quilliam, Australian photographer
William Abdullah Quilliam (1856–1932), a 19th-century convert from Christianity to Islam, founder of England's first mosque and Islamic centre

Other things named Quilliam
Quilliam (think tank), a British anti-Islamist think tank
HMS Quilliam (G09), a Q class destroyer in the Royal Navy during World War II, and the Royal Netherlands Navy 1946–1957

Manx-language surnames
Patronymic surnames
Surnames from given names